The Taft family of the United States has historic origins in Massachusetts; its members have served Ohio, Massachusetts, Vermont, Rhode Island, Utah, and the United States in various positions such as U.S. Representative (two), Governor of Ohio, Governor of Rhode Island, U.S. Senator (three), U.S. Secretary of Agriculture, U.S. Attorney General, U.S. Secretary of War (two), President of the United States, and Chief Justice of the United States.

Overview
The first known ancestor of the Taft family is Richard Robert Taft, who died in County Louth, Kingdom of Ireland in 1700, which is also where his son, Robert Taft Sr., was born circa 1640. Robert Taft Sr. would be the first Taft to migrate to what is now the United States. He married his wife Sarah Simpson, who was born in January 1640 in England, in 1668 in Braintree, Massachusetts. Robert Taft Sr. began a homestead in what is today Uxbridge and then Mendon, circa 1680, and which was where he and his wife died in 1725 and 1726 respectively. His son, Robert Taft Jr., was a member of the founding Board of Selectmen for the new town of Uxbridge in 1727.

A branch of the Massachusetts Taft family descended from Daniel Taft Sr., son of Robert Taft Sr., born at Braintree, 1677–1761, died at Mendon. Daniel, a justice of the peace in Mendon, had a son Josiah Taft, later of Uxbridge, who died in 1756. This branch of the Taft family claims America's first woman voter, Lydia Taft, and five generations of Massachusetts legislators and public servants beginning with Lydia's husband, Josiah Taft.

The Tafts were very prominently represented as soldiers in the Revolutionary War, mostly in the New England states. Peter Rawson Taft I was born in Uxbridge in 1785 and moved to Townshend, Vermont circa 1800. He became a Vermont state legislator. He died in Cincinnati, Hamilton County, Ohio. His son, Alphonso Taft, was born in Townshend, Vermont, and attended Yale University, where he founded the Skull and Bones society. He later was Secretary of War and Attorney General of the United States and the father of President William Howard Taft. Elmshade in Massachusetts was the site of Taft family reunions such as in 1874.

History 

The American Taft family began with Robert Taft Sr. who immigrated to Braintree, Massachusetts circa, 1675. There was early settlement at Mendon, Massachusetts circa 1669 and again in 1680 at what was later Uxbridge, after the King Philip's War ended. Robert's homestead was in western Mendon, in what later became Uxbridge, and his son was on the founding board of selectmen. In 1734, Benjamin Taft started an iron forge, in Uxbridge, where some of the earliest beginnings of America's industrial revolution began. Robert Sr.'s son, Daniel, a justice of the peace in Mendon had a son Josiah Taft, later of Uxbridge, who died in 1756. Josiah's widow became "America's first woman voter", Lydia Chapin Taft, when she voted in three Uxbridge town meetings. President George Washington visited Samuel Taft's Tavern in Uxbridge in 1789 on his "inaugural tour" of New England. President William Howard Taft's grandfather, Peter Rawson Taft I, was born in Uxbridge in 1785. The Hon. Bezaleel Taft Sr., Lydia's son, left a legacy of five generations or more of public service, including at least three generations in the state legislature of Tafts in Massachusetts.
 Ezra Taft Benson, Sr, a famous Mormon pioneer, lived here between 1817–1835, and married his first wife Pamela, of Northbridge, in 1832. This family eventually became an American political dynasty.

The first settler: Robert Taft Sr.
  Robert Taft Sr. ( 1640–1725); The famous Taft family in America developed its roots in Mendon and Uxbridge. Robert Taft, Sr, whose name in Ireland was Robert Taaffe, came  to America from County Louth, Ireland. The original American Taft homestead was in western Mendon, which later became Uxbridge, and was built by Robert Taft Sr., the first immigrant, in 1681. Robert Taft Sr. had built an earlier home in 1669, but it was abandoned due to King Philip's War. Robert Taft Sr.'s descendants are a large politically active family with descendants who are prominent in Ohio, but live throughout the U.S.
 Robert Taft Jr.; was born in 1674 to Robert Sr., and Sarah Taft at Braintree. He grew up in the western part of Mendon in what later became Uxbridge. He became a founding member of the Uxbridge Board of Selectmen in 1727.  Robert Taft Jr. may have been the first American Taft to hold political office. His descendants included a Governor of Rhode Island, Royal Chapin Taft, a United States senator from Ohio, Kingsley Arter Taft, and a U.S. Secretary of Agriculture, Ezra Taft Benson II, among others.

America's first woman voter and her descendants
 Lydia Chapin Taft; Noteworthy among early Uxbridge residents was Lydia Chapin Taft, a Mendon native by birth, who voted in three official Uxbridge town meetings, beginning in 1756. She was the widow of Robert Taft Sr.'s grandson, Josiah Taft, who had served in the Colonial Legislature. Josiah was the son of Daniel Taft of Mendon. Taft was America's First Woman Voter.  This is recognized by the Massachusetts legislature. Her first historic vote, a first in Women's suffrage, was in favor of appropriating funds for the regiments engaged in the French and Indian War.
 Hon. Bezaleel Taft Sr., Lydia's son, held the rank of captain in the American Revolution, and answered the Battle of Lexington and Concord Alarm on April 18, 1775, while Lydia looked on. He went on to become a prominent Massachusetts legislator, and State Senator.  At least 12 soldiers with the surname of Taft served in the Revolutionary War from the town of Uxbridge. Many more Tafts from throughout the former colonies also served in the War of Independence.
 Hon. Bezaleel Taft Jr., the son, followed a legislative career in the Massachusetts General Court, the state Senate, and the State Executive Council.
 Elmshade- Bezaleel Taft Jr. and five generations of influential Tafts lived in a historic home known as Elmshade which was a gathering place for Taft family reunions, and which is now on the National Register of Historic Places. Young William Howard Taft and his father, Alphonso Taft, Secretary of War and founder of Skull and Bones at Yale, visited this home on a number of occasions.
 George Spring Taft, Bezaleel Jr.'s son, was the county prosecutor, and Secretary to U.S. Senator, George Hoar.  George Spring Taft also lived at Elmshade.
 The tradition of public service continued for at least five generations in this Massachusetts branch of the Taft family. The "Life of Alphonso Taft by Lewis Alexander Leonard", on Google Books, is a particularly rich source of the history of the Taft family origins in Massachusetts.
 Other local Tafts Other local Tafts in political service in the Massachusetts legislature included Arthur M. Taft, Arthur Robert Taft, and Zadok Arnold Taft. Royal Chapin Taft, originally from Northbridge, became the Governor of Rhode Island. The number of Tafts in public service across America was extraordinary including New Hampshire, Rhode Island, Vermont, Ohio, Michigan, Utah, and other states.

A Presidential visit
 First President's visit; Samuel Taft was an American Revolutionary War soldier, father of 22, an Uxbridge farmer and tavern keeper. President George Washington stayed at the Samuel Taft Tavern in November 1789, during the founding father's inaugural trip through New England.
November 8, 1789.
Sir:
Being informed that you have given my name to one of your sons, and called another after Mrs. Washington's family, and being moreover very much pleased with the modest and innocent looks of your two daughters, Patty and Polly, I do for these reasons send each of these girls a piece of chintz; and to Patty, who bears the name of Mrs. Washington, and who waited more upon us than Polly did, I send five guineas, with which she may buy herself any little ornament she may want, or she may dispose of them in any other manner more agreeable to herself. As I do not give these things with a view to having it talked of, or even to its being known, the less there is said about the matter the better you will please me; but, that I may be sure the chintz and money have got safe to hand, let Patty, who I dare say is equal to it, write me a line informing me thereof, directed to 'The President of the United States at New York.' I wish you and your family well, and am,
etc. Yours,
George Washington
<div>– Letter to Mr. Samuel Taft, written from Hartford, Connecticut on November 8, 1789

Mendon-Uxbridge connections to the Ohio Tafts, Presidential ancestors
President William Howard Taft's grandfather, Peter Rawson Taft I, was born in Uxbridge in 1785 and grew up there. His father Aaron moved to Townshend, Vermont, because of the difficult economy, when he was fifteen. The story is told that Peter Rawson walked a cow all the way from Uxbridge to Townshend, a distance of well over 100 miles. The "Aaron Taft house" is now on the National Register of Historic Places. Peter Rawson Taft I became a Vermont legislator and eventually died in Hamilton County, Cincinnati, Ohio. Peter Rawson Taft's son, Alphonso Taft, founded Skull and Bones at Yale, served as U.S. Secretary of War, and his son William Howard became the U.S. President. The ancestry of U.S. presidents traces to Uxbridge and Mendon more than once, including both presidents bearing the last name Bush. President Taft, a champion for world peace and the only president to also serve as Chief Justice of the United States, returned to Uxbridge for family reunions. He remarked as he stepped off the train there on April 3, 1905, "Uxbridge,... I think I have more relatives here than in any town in America."  Young William Howard Taft had made other trips to Uxbridge, and Bezaleel Taft, Jr.'s home, "Elmshade", in his earlier years. It was at "Elmshade" that young William Howard Taft likely heard his father, Alphonso Taft, proudly deliver an oratory on the Taft family history and the family's roots in Uxbridge, and Mendon, circa 1874. President Taft stayed at the Samuel Taft tavern when he visited Uxbridge, as did George Washington 120 years earlier. The New York Times recorded President Taft's visits to his ancestral homes in Mendon and Uxbridge during his presidency. William Howard Taft, as a young boy, spent a number of summers in the Blackstone Valley in Millbury, Massachusetts, and even attended schools for at least a term in that nearby town.

A Mormon apostle
Ezra T. Benson (to distinguish him from his famous great-grandson, Ezra Taft Benson), a Mendon and Uxbridge native, is famous as a key early apostle of the Mormon religion. His own autobiography states that he lived in Uxbridge between 1817–1835, or about 17 years, after his mother, Chloe Taft and father, John Benson, moved to a farm there. Young Ezra married Pamela Andrus, of Northbridge, on January 1, 1832, at Uxbridge. He had moved in with his family in an Uxbridge center Hotel in 1827. He and Pamela lived here in the 1830s, had children, and had a child who died, which is recorded in the Uxbridge Vital Records.  He later managed and owned the hotel in Uxbridge Center before investing in a cotton mill at Holland, Massachusetts. He moved to Holland Mass in 1835.  He later moved to Illinois, and became a Mormon apostle. Ezra joined the LDS Church at Quincy, Illinois in 1840, entered plural marriages, marrying seven more wives after Pamela. He was called to the Quorum of the Twelve Apostles by Brigham Young in 1846, a high post within the LDS Church. He had eight wives and 32 children. He was a Missionary to the Sandwich Islands, also known as Hawaii. He served as a Representative to the Utah Territorial Assembly. He died in Ogden, Utah, in 1869.

Tafts in the Blackstone Valley's industrialization
Benjamin Taft started the first iron forge in the Ironstone section of Uxbridge in 1734 There was good quality "bog iron ore" here. Caleb Handy added a triphammer, and scythes and guns were manufactured here before 1800. The Taft family continued to be instrumental in the early industrialization of the Blackstone Valley including mills built by a 4th generation descendant of Robert Taft I, the son of Deborah Taft, Daniel Day in 1810, and his son in law, Luke Taft (1825) and Luke's son, Moses Taft in (1852). These woolen mills, some of the first to use power looms, and satinets, ran 24/7 during the Civil War producing cloth for U.S. military uniforms. The 1814 Rivulet Mill Complex was established at North Uxbridge by Chandler Taft. In 1855, 2.5 million yards of cloth was produced in the mills of Uxbridge. Uxbridge is the center of the Blackstone Valley, the earliest industrialized region in the United States. It is part of the John H. Chafee Blackstone River Valley National Heritage Corridor. Samuel Slater, who built his mill in (1790), at Pawtucket, Rhode Island, on the Blackstone River, was credited by President Andrew Jackson as the father of America's industrial revolution.

Mayor Henry Chapin: an Uxbridge "Taft" story
In 1864, Judge Henry Chapin, a three-term Worcester Mayor and Chief Judge, quoted a well known Uxbridge story as follows: A stranger came to town, met a new person and said, "Hello Mr. Taft". Mr. Taft said, "How did you know my name?" The stranger replied, "I presumed that you were a Taft, just like the other 12 Tafts I have just met!". This story was repeated in a poem form by Mayor Chapin, at a famous Taft family reunion here, recorded in the Life of Alphonso Taft.

Family tree 

Prominent members of the Taft family include:
Robert Taft Sr. (1640–1724), the immigrant

Descendants of Joseph Taft

Joseph Taft (1680–1747), son of Robert Taft Sr.
Peter Taft (1715–1783)
Aaron Taft (1743–1808)
Peter Rawson Taft I (1785–1867), member of the Vermont legislature
Alphonso Taft (1810–1891), U.S. secretary of war (1876), U.S. attorney general (1876–1877); married first to Fanny Phelps, and second to his cousin Louisa Maria Torrey (see below)
Charles Phelps Taft I (1843–1929), U.S. representative (1895–1897), publisher (The Cincinnati Times-Star), U.S. representative, owner of the Philadelphia Athletics from 1905 to 1913 and Chicago Cubs from 1914 to 1916. Married Anna Sinton, daughter of David Sinton.
 Jane Taft, married Albert S. Ingalls, son of Melville E. Ingalls
 David Sinton Ingalls (1899–1985), flying ace in World War I, Assistant Secretary of the Navy for Aeronautics from 1929–1932, candidate for governor of Ohio (1932). Married Louise Hale Harkness, daughter of William L. Harkness and granddaughter of Daniel M. Harkness.
Peter Rawson Taft II (1846–1889), m. Annie Matilda Hulbert.
 Hulbert Taft Sr. (1877–1959), publisher, associate editor, and reporter for the Cincinnati Times Star.
David Gibson Taft (1916–1962), businessman, Vice-Chairman of the board of Taft Broadcasting Company. Served as Executive Vice President of Radio Cincinnati, Taft Broadcasting's predecessor. In 1955 he was made manager of WKRC-TV. WWII served as captain in the US Army and liaison officer for General Joe Stillwell.
 Hulbert Taft Jr. (1907–1967), broadcaster (Taft Broadcasting)
 Dudley S. Taft Sr. (b. 1940), businessman, President and Board Chairman of Taft Broadcasting, Cinergy, Tribune Co.
Dudley S. Taft Jr. (b. 1966), blues musician, Sweetwater guitarist, Second Coming guitarist, Dudley Taft Band; co-wrote "Unknown Rider" for 1999 film The Sixth Sense
 Thomas Woodall Taft (b. 1969), actor, writer, businessman, founder of Southern Star Interactive.
William Howard Taft I (1857–1930), U.S. president (1909–1913), U.S. chief justice (1921–1930), U.S. secretary of war (1904–1908). Married Helen Louise Herron.
Robert Alphonso Taft Sr. (1889–1953), U.S. senator from Ohio (1939–1953), three-time unsuccessful Presidential candidate (1940, 1948, 1952). Married Martha Wheaton Bowers, daughter of Lloyd Wheaton Bowers.
William Howard Taft III (1915–1991), ambassador to Ireland
William Howard Taft IV (b. 1945), Deputy Secretary of Defense (1984–1989), chief legal adviser to the U.S. Department of State (2001–2005). Married Julia Ann Vadala Taft.
 William Howard Taft V (b. 1978), lawyer, member of the International Commercial Disputes Committee of the New York City Bar Association. Married Begum Inci Bengu.
Robert Alphonso Taft Jr. (1917–1993), U.S. senator from Ohio (1971–1976)
Robert Alphonso "Bob" Taft III (b. 1942), governor of Ohio (1999–2007)
Lloyd Bowers Taft (1923–1985), investment banker in Cincinnati
Horace Dwight Taft (1925–1983), physics professor and dean of faculty at Yale University
John G. Taft (b. 1954), financier and writer
 Helen Herron Taft Manning (1891–1987), professor of history and college dean, married Frederick Johnson Manning
 Charles Phelps Taft II (1897–1983), Charterite Cincinnati mayor (1955–1957), Cincinnati city council member (1938–1942), Hamilton County, Ohio, prosecutor (1927–1928), candidate for governor of Ohio (1952), candidate for Republican nomination for Ohio governor (1958)
Seth Chase Taft (1922–2013), candidate for Ohio Senate (1962); candidate for mayor of Cleveland, Ohio (1967); candidate for Republican nomination for governor of Ohio (1982)
 Peter Rawson Taft III (b. 1936), United States Assistant Attorney General Department of Justice; married to Diana Todd
Henry Waters Taft (1859–1945), candidate for justice of New York Court of Appeals (1898); New York delegate to Republican National Convention (1920, 1924); named partner at Cadwalader, Wickersham & Taft (from 1919)
Walbridge Smith Taft (1885–1951), candidate for U.S. representative from New York
 William Howard Taft II (1887–1952)
 Horace Dutton Taft (1861–1943), author, founder of The Taft School in Watertown, Connecticut

Descendants of Robert Taft Jr.

Robert Taft Jr. (1674–1748), Founding Board of Selectmen, Town of Uxbridge, Massachusetts
Robert Taft III (1697–1777)
 Robert Taft IV (1724–1787)
 Lovett Taft (1756–1837)
 Aurin Post Taft (1788–1861)
 Frederick Lovett Taft I (1811–1869)
 Newton Archibald Taft (1843–1890)
 Frederick Lovett Taft II (1870–1913)
 Kingsley Arter Taft (1903–1970), U.S. senator, chief justice of the Ohio Supreme Court
David Taft, COO of Landec Corp., trustee of Kenyon College
 Sheldon A. Taft, candidate for Ohio Supreme Court judgeship
 Charles Newton Taft (1904–1980)
 William Wilson Taft (b. 1932), Ohio state senator
 William Wilson Taft Jr., musician
Israel Taft (1699–1753), pioneer
Samuel Taft (1735–1816), soldier in the Revolutionary War
Hannah Taft
Elias Benjamin
Chester Benjamin
William Benjamin
Elijah H. Taft Benjamin
Darius Benjamin
Hannah Benjamin
Cyrus Benjamin
Mary Benjamin
Jacob Taft
 Jacob Taft, married to his 1st cousin once removed, Mary Taft (see below)
 Orsmus Taft
 Royal Chapin Taft (1823–1912), Governor of Rhode Island, 1888–1889
 Eastman Taft, married to his 2nd cousin, Hannah Taft (see below)
 Chloe Taft
 Ezra Taft Benson I (1811–1869), Mormon apostle and Representative to the Utah Territorial Legislature
 George Taft Benson Sr.
 George Taft Benson Jr.
 Ezra Taft Benson II (1899–1994), U.S. Secretary of Agriculture, 1953–1961; President of the LDS Church, 1985–94
Bonnie Amussen Benson
Mark Benson Madsen (b. 1963), Utah State Senate, 2005–2017
 Mark A. Benson
Steve Benson (b. 1954), Pulitzer Prize winning cartoonist
Michael T. Benson (b. 1965), President of Eastern Kentucky University, Southern Utah University, and Snow College
 Reed Benson (1928–2016), national director of public relations for the John Birch Society
 Huldah Taft
 Chloe Daniel
 Anna Davenport
 Samuel Davenport Torrey
 Louisa Maria Torrey (1827–1907), married to her 4th cousin twice removed, Alphonso Taft (see above)
 John Taft
Jesse Taft
 Hannah Taft, married to her 2nd cousin, Eastman Taft (see above)
 Mary Taft, married to her 1st cousin once removed, Jacob Taft (see above)

Descendants of Daniel Taft Sr.

 Daniel Taft Sr., Massachusetts General Court, Colonial Legislature
 Daniel Taft Jr.
 Nathan Taft
 Zadok Lovell Taft
 Don Carlos Taft
 Lorado Zadoc Taft (1860–1936), sculptor
 Emily Taft Douglas (1899–1994),  Congresswoman, U.S. representative
 Josiah Taft (1709–1756), Massachusetts General Court, Legislature; married to Lydia Taft, America's First Woman Voter
 Hon. Bezaleel Taft Sr. (1750–1839), Massachusetts General Court, Legislature
 Hon. Bezaleel Taft Jr. (1780–1846), Massachusetts General Court, Legislature
 George Spring Taft (1826–1860), Secretary for U.S. Senator George Hoar
Henry Gordon Taft (1832–1903), Commissioner of Worcester County, Massachusetts from 1876 to 1903

Descendants of Thomas Taft

Thomas Taft
Joseph Taft
 Noah Taft
 Timothy Taft
 Sullivan Taft
 Abigail Wright Taft
 Infant Son Adams
 Russell Webster Adams
 Timothy Sullivan Taft
 Sarah Jane Taft
 John J. Williams
 Harry Taft Williams
 Marguerite Williams
 Parker Merrill Williams
 Mary Flagg Taft
 Olive Maria Bolton
 William Henry Bolton
 George Lemuel Bolton
 Bernice L. Bolton
 Mildred Annette Bolton
 Richard E. Thompson
 Eleanor M. Thompson
 Gerald J. Thompson
 Neil C. Thompson
 William Henry Bolton Jr
 Grace Madeline Bolton
 Florence Maud Bolton
 Mary Eliza Bolton
 Earl Dewey Rice
 Marion Lucy Rice
 Louise May Rice Joy
 Gratia Cyrena Rice
 Daisy Idella Rice
 Clara Ruth Rice
 Donald E. Crossin
 Carrie Louisa Bolton Kingsley
 Hugh Samuel Bolton
 Edward Spencer Bolton
 Cecil Bolton
 Ransom Sullivan Bolton
 Aurora Lucy Bolton
 Olive Maria Bolton
 Louisa Jennie Cook
 John Martindale Bolton
 William Bolton
 Arlene Elnora Bolton
 Mark Lynn Gilbert
 Viola Jane Bolton
 Francis S Bolton
 Infant Son Bolton
 Lemuel M. Bolton
 George Colburn Bolton
 George Deane Bolton
 Corrina Mary Bolton
 Ruth S. Bolton
 Harold Lester Bolton
 Samuel Bolton
 Lucy Eliza Taft
 William Sullivan Gleason
 William Everett Gleason
 Ellen Melissa Gleason
 Infant Son Kinsman
 Elton Bliss Kinsman
 Francis Swain Kinsman
 Russell Walter Kinsman
 Francis Rollo Kinsman
 Ernest Gleason Kinsman
 Elton B Kinsman
 Florence Marian Gleason
 Leon Martin Blanchard
 Lena Swain Blanchard
 Irene Marjorie Blanchard
 Clyde William Willis
 Edwin Spencer Gleason
 Bertha Maud Gleason
 Harold Everett Johnson
 Howard William Johnson
 Madelyn Bertha Johnson
 Henry Lyman Gleason
 Earl W. Gleason
 Howard H. Gleason
 Cora Melissa Gleason
 Roy E Allard
 Alice Cora Allard White
 Edward Homer Gleason
 Spencer Lewis Gleason
 Adoniram Judson Gleason
 George Bordman Gleason
 Mary Lucy Gleason Gale
 Sarah Celicia Gleason
 Elizabeth Ellen Jones
 Sarah Maria (Sadie) Jones
 James Homer Gleason
 Thomas Spencer Gleason
 Edward Homer Gleason
 Julia A. Gleason
 Nellie Edna Read
 Homer Taft Read
 Sarah Maria Taft
 George Russel Brown
 Ella Maria Brown
 Helen Josephine Shay
 Ernest Francis Shay
 Florence Louise Shay
 Etta Branch Brown
 Winfield Martin Brown
 Linna May Brown
 Orville Short Brown
 Lula Louise Brown (adopted: Temple)
 Osburne Amos Hutchins
 Osburne Clarke Hutchins
 James Frederick Hutchins, Eli Lilly & Company scientist
 Scott Andrew Hutchins Green Party political candidate
 Olive Glenwood Hutchins
 Harold Russell Flanagan
 Elliot Clarke Hutchins
 Gertrude Ann Hutchins
 Helen Louise Hutchins
 Sadie Russel Brown (adopted: Maxwell)
 Infant Son Brown
 Mary Maria Brown
 Orville Martin Brown
 Clayton Roberts
 Andrew Jackson Taft (1815–1816)
 Andrew Jackson Taft (1817–1901)
 Adoniram Judson Taft
 Chloe Taft m. Eastman Taft, son of Jacob Taft, grandson of Israel Taft, who was widowed by Hannah Taft (see above)
 Eastman Taft, Jr.
 Chloe Taft
 John Benson, Jr.
 Ezra Taft Benson
 Ezra Taft
 Micajah Taft
 Charlotte Taft
 Emily Carpenter
 Emily Maria Slater
 Alice Carpenter Slater
 Abby Taft m. Chandler Taft, son of Calvin Clark Taft
 Augustine Calvin Taft
 Alice Bradford Taft
 Walton Chandler Taft
 Maria Taft m. Mellen Taft, son of Calvin Clark Taft
 Charlotte Isabelle Taft
 Angelo Mellen Arnold
 David Taft
 Hopestill Taft m. Benjamin Clark Taft, son of Calvin Clark Taft
 Timothy Taft
 Asenath Cummings Taft
 Sarah Marsh Taft
 Emeline Newell Taft
 Emily H. Wing
 Henry Taft Wing
 Edgar Taft Wing
 Charles Augustus Taft
 Ellen Bowen Taft
 Emma Elizabeth Taft
 Sarah Adeline Taft
 Lydia Arnold Taft
 Polly Taft
 Robert Hague Davis
 David Taft
 Chloe Taft
 Adeline Newall Walker
 Charlotte Taft
 Joseph Taft
 Eleazer Taft

Collins family

The related Collins family tree:

Ela Collins (1786–1848), New York Assemblyman 1815, U.S. Representative from New York 1823–1825. Father of William Collins.
William Collins (1818–1878), U.S. Representative from New York 1847–1849. Uncle of Helen Herron, who married President William Howard Taft.

Lippitt family

The related Lippitt family tree:
Christopher Lippitt (1744–1824) Revolutionary War officer, legislator, manufacturer
Henry Lippitt (1818–1891), Governor of Rhode Island 1875–1877. Father of Charles W. Lippitt and Henry F. Lippitt.
Charles W. Lippitt (1846–1924), Governor of Rhode Island 1895–1897. Son of Henry Lippitt.
Henry F. Lippitt (1856–1933), U.S. Senator from Rhode Island 1911–1917. Son of Henry Lippitt and married Lucy Herron Laughlin, sister of Helen Herron, who married President William Howard Taft.
Frederick Lippitt (1916–2005), Rhode Island State Representative 1961–1983.  Military officer, political figure and philanthropist.

Chafee family
John Chafee (1922–1999), Rhode Island State Representative 1957–1963, Governor of Rhode Island 1963–1969, U.S. Secretary of the Navy 1969–1972, candidate for U.S. Senate from Rhode Island 1972, U.S. Senator from Rhode Island 1976–1999. Grandnephew of Henry F. Lippitt.
Lincoln Chafee (b. 1953), Mayor of Warwick, Rhode Island 1992–1999; U.S. Senator from Rhode Island 1999–2007; Governor of Rhode Island 2011–2015 and 2016 Democratic presidential candidate. Son of John Chafee.

Others

Thomas Wilson (1827–1910), delegate to the Minnesota Constitutional Convention 1857, District Court Judge in Minnesota 1857–1864, Justice of the Minnesota Supreme Court 1864–1865, Chief Justice of the Minnesota Supreme Court 1865–1869, Minnesota State Representative 1880–1882, Minnesota State Senator 1880–1882, U.S. Representative from Minnesota 1887–1889, candidate for Governor of Minnesota 1890. Grandfather of Martha Wheaton Bowers, who married Senator Robert A. Taft.
John W. Herron, delegate to the Ohio Constitutional Convention 1873, U.S. Attorney in Ohio 1889–1894. Father-in-law of President William Howard Taft.
Paul Douglas (1892–1976), Chicago, Illinois Alderman; candidate for U.S. Senate from Illinois 1942, U.S. Senator from Illinois 1949–1967. Husband of Emily Taft Douglas.

References

External links
Taft Family Genealogy Page
The Political Graveyard – Taft Family

 
American families of English ancestry
American families of Scotch-Irish ancestry
First Families of the United States